Cao Xiong (fl. 220s) was a son of Cao Cao, a warlord who rose to power towards the end of the Han dynasty and laid the foundation of the state of Cao Wei in the Three Kingdoms period of China. Not much was recorded in history about Cao Xiong, except that he died at a relatively young age. His mother was Lady Bian, who also bore Cao Cao another three sons – Cao Pi, Cao Zhang and Cao Zhi. Cao Xiong was the youngest of the four.

In 221, after Cao Pi ended the Han dynasty and established Wei, he granted Cao Chong the posthumous title "Duke Huai of Xiao" (蕭懷公). In 229, during the reign of Cao Pi's son Cao Rui, Cao Xiong was posthumously elevated to the status of a prince, so his posthumous title became "Prince Huai of Xiao" (蕭懷王).

Succession

In 234, Cao Xiong's son, Cao Bing (曹炳), was granted a princedom with 2,500 taxable households. The princedom was named "Xiao" (蕭), per Cao Xiong's posthumous title. Cao Bing died six years later and his princedom was abolished because he had no heir. He was given the posthumous name "Prince Ai" (哀王).

In Romance of the Three Kingdoms
Cao Xiong was briefly mentioned in the 14th-century historical novel Romance of the Three Kingdoms. In 220, when Cao Cao died, Cao Xiong refused to go to Luoyang to attend his father's funeral. Acting on Hua Xin's suggestion, Cao Pi sent a messenger to reprimand his brother, but the messenger returned later and reported that Cao Xiong had hanged himself for fear of receiving punishment. Cao Pi had his brother buried with full honours and gave him the posthumous title "Prince Huai of Xiao".

See also
 Lists of people of the Three Kingdoms

References

 Chen, Shou (3rd century). Records of the Three Kingdoms (Sanguozhi).
 Luo, Guanzhong (14th century). Romance of the Three Kingdoms (Sanguo Yanyi).

Family of Cao Cao